Land of No Return is a 1978 thriller film written, directed, and produced by Kent Bateman, father of Jason and Justine Bateman. The film stars Mel Torme and William Shatner.

The film was shot in Utah and released theatrically by The International Picture Show Company, whose president at the time was legendary B-movie filmmaker Bill Rebane.

Alternate titles for the film include Challenge to Survive and Snowman.

Plot 
Zak O'Brien (Mel Torme) is an animal trainer for the popular television series Caesar & Romulus, which has been selected for a "Patsy" Award to be presented in Burbank, California. Zak, along with Caesar (a golden eagle), and Romulus (a wolf), board his personal plane in Denver for the flight to Burbank, but en route at night over the Utah wastelands, they encounter a sudden blizzard. When Zak's radio and engine fail, he guides the craft down to a crash landing. All three passengers survive, but the plane is destroyed and a struggle for survival begins.

Production
Parts of the film were shot in Utah.

References

External links

1978 films
American independent films
1970s thriller films
Films shot in Utah
1970s English-language films
1970s American films